Ramu Sasikumar, or R. Sasikumar for short, is a former Singaporean footballer and sports marketing executive. He is known for scoring the winning and solitary goal for Singapore in the 1998 AFF Championship final. He currently manages the Red Card Group, a sports marketing firm.

Football career
Sasikumar became famous after the final of the 1998 AFF Championship, when Singapore played against hosts Vietnam. In the 70th minute, he scored a goal with his shoulder, which was dubbed the "Shoulder of God", which won the Lions their first ever international title and breaking Vietnamese hearts.

In 2000, Sasikumar retired from football after Singapore exited the 2000 AFF Championship from the group stage.

After football 
After retiring from football, Sasikumar founded the Red Card Group, a sports marketing firm.

In 2017, Sasikumar expressed interest in contesting the elections for the Football Association of Singapore council but was not named as a candidate.

Sasikumar also bought Admiralty FC in the 2nd division of the Singapore National Football League.

References

Singaporean footballers
Singapore international footballers
Association football defenders
Singaporean people of Tamil descent
Singaporean sportspeople of Indian descent
Year of birth missing